mag+ is a digital publishing platform to create content for tablets and smartphones.

The platform 

The mag+ digital publishing platform consists of a set of tools:

 The mag+ Plugin, a plugin to Adobe InDesign CS5 – CC 2019.
 The mag+ Feature Builder, a HTML-wizard for creating interactive elements.
 The mag+ Production, a content planning tool.
 The mag+ Reviewer, an iOS, Android & Kindle Fire app for reviewing the content created on the target device.
 The mag+ Publish, a web-based app building and app management tool.

History 

In 2009, Bonnier's Research and Development unit started a project to investigate how tablets will change the magazine industry.

In April 2010, Popular Science iPad App, created by the project team, was presented by Steve Jobs on stage during the launch of iOS 4 and the company began offering its software.

In January 2011, the company Moving Media+ AB was formally founded.

In September 2011, the company changed its name to mag+ AB in Sweden and to magplus Inc in the US. The name mag+ has since been used for the software. The name mag+ originate from Magazine and the + character represents an enhanced magazine experience enabled by the interactive multi media possibilities that tablets and smartphones offers, compared to print media.

As of June 2015, over 4,500 apps have been built on the mag+ platform.

In July 2016, MPS Limited acquired mag+.

Owners 
The company is owned by the publishing services company MPS Limited.

Clients
Apps based on the platform:

 Bloomberg Markets
 British Journal of Photography
 Chicago Sun-Times
 I'm Zlatan
 Investment Week
 AnyFlip
 Macworld
 MAD Magazine
 Maxim
 Popular Photography
 Popular Science
 PUB Html5
 RedEye
 Symbolia
 The Next Web Magazine
 San Francisco Chronicle
 Slide Html5
 Victoria & Albert Museum
 Web MD

References

External links 

Electronic publishing
Software companies of Sweden
Companies established in 2011